Invalides is a station on Line 8 and Line 13 of the Paris Métro, as well as a station on RER C. Located in the 7th arrondissement, it is situated near and named after Les Invalides, although La Tour-Maubourg (Line 8) and Varenne (Line 13) are closer to the building.

History
The Métro station was opened on 13 July 1913 as part of the original section of Line 8 between Beaugrenelle (now Charles Michels on Line 10) and Opéra. The Line 13 platforms were opened on 20 December 1923 as part of the original section of Line 10 between Invalides and Croix-Rouge (a station east of Sèvres – Babylone, which was closed during World War II). On 27 July 1937 the section of Line 10 between Invalides and Duroc was transferred to become the first section of the old Line 14, which was connected under the Seine and incorporated into Line 13 on 9 November 1976.

The Palais Bourbon, seat of the National Assembly (the lower house of the French Parliament), is nearby, also served by Assemblée Nationale on Line 12.

Lines serving this station
 Métro 8
 Métro 13
 RER C

Passenger services

Access
The station has a single access to the eastern part of the Esplanade des Invalides near the intersection of Rue de Constantine and Rue de l'Université.

Station layout

Métro

RER

Gallery

Métro

RER

RER Station

The RER station was opened on 31 May 1902 by the Chemins de fer de l'Ouest. It was originally a terminus but was extended to Gare d'Orsay & the line converted to RER C in 1979.

Nearby
 Hôtel des Invalides
 Palais Bourbon

See also

 List of stations of the Paris Métro
 List of stations of the Paris RER

External links

 

Paris Métro stations in the 7th arrondissement of Paris
Railway stations in France opened in 1913
Réseau Express Régional stations
Railway stations located underground in France